Lena Cruz is a New Zealand actress who is probably best known for her role as Sofia Martinez in long-running soap Shortland Street.

Filmography

Film

Television

References

Further reading

External links

Living people
New Zealand television actresses
New Zealand soap opera actresses
New Zealand people of Filipino descent
Year of birth missing (living people)
20th-century New Zealand actresses
21st-century New Zealand actresses